Ahmad Shah's Mosque, also known as  Shahi Jam-e-Masjid or Juni Juma Masjid is the oldest mosque of Ahmedabad, India.

History and architecture

The mosque was erected by the founder of Ahmedabad, Ahmad Shah I, in 1414. It said to have been used as the royal household's private mosque. According to the inscription at the upper part of the central mihrab, the foundation date seems to be the 4th day of Shawwal month in 817 AH, which is 17 December 1414. The pavement is of white marble, the canopy covered pulpit has a yellow marble balustrade carved in a leafy pattern, and white marble steps. In the courtyard is a mound called Ganj Shahid or the martyrs' mound, the tomb of warriors who perished in Sultan Ahmed's early fights.

The mosque covers area of 700 square metres and have two rows of ten large domes surrounded by several smaller domes. The mosque is supported by 152 pillars and have four arched gateways. There are eight perforated stone windows and 25 fine carved pillars. The pillars inside the mosque were taken from Hindu/Jain temples, and some still possess Hindu figures. One pillar retains an inscription in Old Gujarati dated to 1252 from the reign of Vīsaladeva Vāghelā, identifying its origin from a temple to Uttareśvara in Mahiṁsaka (an unidentified locality in North Gujarat).

References 

Mosques in Ahmedabad
Monuments of National Importance in Gujarat
Mosques completed in 1414